Sorn Silpabanleng (6 August 1881 – 8 March 1954), commonly known by his title as Luang Pradit Pairoh (also spelled Pradit Phairoh) was a Thai musician who was famous in playing Thai instruments and composed original Thai song.

Biography 
Luang Pradit Pairoh had the original name "Sorn". He was born on 6 August 1881 at Dowadeung Sub-district, Amphawa District, Samut Songkhram Province, in the reign of King Rama V. He was the son of Mr.Sin and Mrs.Yim Sinbanleng. His father was owner of a gamelan band and was Pra Pradit Pairoh's disciple (Mee Duriyangkul).

Musical ability 

Sorn could play Khong wong yai when he was five years old. When he was eleven years old, he began to study how to play gamelan. He played xylophone swiftly since childhood. He was taught by his father until he was able to perform the best performance in the Mae Klong River basin. This made him more popular among musicians.

In 1900, when he was 19 years old, he was performing xylophone to Prince Bhanurangsi Savangwongse, a younger brother of King Chulalongkorn. Prince Bhanurangsi Savangwongse bring Sorn into the Buraphaphirom Palace to be xylophone player. Later, on June 27, 1925, Silpabanleng was given the title of Luang Pradit Pairoh in the department of dramatic arts by insurrection 400. The ceremony was held on July 11 at Borompiman Hall, and was given the rank of bridegroom on July 13 the same year. On the other hand, he had never been in the department before, but because of his skill and ability, he was engaging.

In 1926, Luang Pradit Pairoh has served in the department of gamelan and ministry of royal pantomime. He contributed his teaching of music to King Rama VII and King Rama VII's wife. There are three songs that he help King's royal writing, such as Ratreepradupdoaw,  Khmerrahong, Homrongkluenkratopfung.

He died on March 8, 1954. His age was 73 years old.

Workmanship

Overture 

Krataetaimai, Prathomdusit, Sornthong, PrachumTewarach, Bangkhun, Mahsabudkeep etc.

Set Song 

Krataichomduen, Khomthong, Khmer, Khmerpaktor, Taohe, Jeenlunthun, etc.

Royal decorations 

  Order of the Crown of Thailand - 5th Class
  Dushdi Mala Medal, Pin of Art and Sciences (May 5, 1929)
  King Rama V Rajaruchi Medal (Gold Medal)
  King Rama VI Rajaruchi Medal (Gold Medal)

Legacy 

The Overture, a fictionalised account of his life was filmed in 2004. It received many awards in Thailand and was submitted to the Academy Award for Best Foreign Film. It has also been adapted into a television series on Thai PBS in 2012.

In 2017, he was featured as a Google Doodle on what would have been his 136th birthday.

References 

Thai musicians of Thai classical music
Luang (nobility)
1881 births
1954 deaths